Hopen is the administrative center of Smøla Municipality in Møre og Romsdal county, Norway. The village lies east of the villages of Dyrnes and Råket on the northern coast of the island of Smøla.  The main road through Hopen is Norwegian County Road 669 which also heads north connecting many small islands and ending at the island village of Veiholmen.  Hopen Church is located in the village. In 2015, there were 930 residents of Hopen.

Name
The name comes from the Old Norse word  which means "bay".

References

Villages in Møre og Romsdal
Smøla